De Priest Hollow is a valley in Oregon County in the U.S. state of Missouri.

De Priest Hollow has the name of Isaac De Priest, a county official.

References

Valleys of Oregon County, Missouri
Valleys of Missouri